Kumar is a title mainly found in India, Bangladesh and Nepal denoting prince, referring to sons of a Raja, Rana or Thakur. It is synonymous to the Rajput title Kunwar. The south Indian version of the title is Kumara. The female version is Kumari. 
When there are more than one, the heirs are referred by their order in precedence i.e. First Kumar of Blank, Second Kumar of Blank & c.

Notable people

 Kunwar Nau Nihal Singh (1821-1840), ruler of the Punjab region of the Indian subcontinent
 Kumar Aiyappan Pillai
 Kunwar Natwar Singh

References

Court titles
Feudalism
Royal titles
Noble titles
Positions of authority
 
Men's social titles
Indian court titles